Singarajupalem is a village  located in Andhra Pradesh's West Godavari district. It is one among the 33 villages of Nallajerla mandal.
                         

Villages in West Godavari district